The Very Best of Jerry Garcia is a two-CD compilation album.  It contains songs, mostly previously released, by Jerry Garcia, the Jerry Garcia Band, the Jerry Garcia Acoustic Band, Old & In the Way, and Reconstruction. It is meant to showcase Garcia's work outside the Grateful Dead.  The first disc contains studio recordings and the second disc contains live recordings.  It was released on September 26, 2006.

Some copies of the album include two bonus discs called More of the Best and Twisted Radio Waves.

The Very Best of Jerry Garcia was released for Record Store Day as a five-disc LP, in a limited edition of 4,000 copies, on September 26, 2020.

Track listing
Disc one (studio)
From  Garcia:
"Deal" (Jerry Garcia, Robert Hunter) – 3:14
"Bird Song" (Garcia, Hunter) – 4:26
"Sugaree" (Garcia, Hunter) – 5:54
"Loser" (Garcia, Hunter) – 4:10
"The Wheel" (Garcia, Hunter) – 4:12
From Compliments:
"Let It Rock" (Chuck Berry) – 3:12
"Russian Lullaby" (Irving Berlin) – 3:04
From Reflections:
"Might as Well" (Garcia, Hunter) – 3:54
"Mission in the Rain" (Garcia, Hunter) – 5:04
"I'll Take a Melody" (Allen Toussaint) – 9:28
From Cats Under the Stars:
"Rubin and Cherise" (Garcia, Hunter) – 5:17
"Cats Under the Stars" (Garcia, Hunter) – 5:31
"Rhapsody in Red" (Garcia, Hunter, John Kahn) – 5:11
From Run for the Roses:
"Run for the Roses" (Garcia, Hunter) – 3:41
"Knockin' on Heaven's Door" (Bob Dylan) – 7:40
"Without Love" (Clyde McPhatter) – 4:26

Disc two (live)
From Breakdown:
"Catfish John" (Bob McDill, Allen Reynolds) – 4:06
From Almost Acoustic:
"Deep Elem Blues" (traditional) – 6:09
"Ripple" (Garcia, Hunter) – 4:21
From Garcia Plays Dylan:
"Positively 4th Street" (Dylan) – 10:46
From Pure Jerry: Theatre 1839, July 29 & 30, 1977:
"The Harder They Come" (Jimmy Cliff) – 12:43
From How Sweet It Is:
"Gomorrah" (Garcia, Hunter) – 6:37
Previously unreleased performance by Reconstruction on July 8, 1979:
"Dear Prudence" (John Lennon, Paul McCartney) - 11:38
From Jerry Garcia Band:
"Señor (Tales of Yankee Power)" (Dylan) - 7:45
"Evangeline" (David Hidalgo, Louie Perez) – 4:47
From Way After Midnight, the bonus disc for After Midnight: Kean College, 2/28/80:
"Deal" (Garcia, Hunter) - 9:12

Personnel
See individual albums for musical personnel.

Production
Compilation producers – James Austin, Joe Gastwirt, Blair Jackson, Peter McQuaid
Product manager – Jimmy Edwards
Tape research, liner notes – Blair Jackson
Remastering – Joe Gastwirt
Discographical annotation – Reggie Collins
Editorial supervision – Dorothy Stefanski
Art direction, design – Jean Krikorian
Photography – Herb Greene, Jon Sievert, Richard E. Aaron, Dave Patrick
Painting – Jerry Garcia
Project assistance – Karen LeBlanc, James O'Toole

References

Jerry Garcia compilation albums
Rhino Records compilation albums
Jerry Garcia live albums
2006 live albums
2006 greatest hits albums
Rhino Records live albums